Brome and Oakley is a civil parish in the Mid Suffolk district of the English county of Suffolk. The parish is in the north of the county, immediately south of the River Waveney which marks the border with Norfolk.

The parish was formed in 1982 from the parishes of Brome and Oakley. The A140 Norwich to Ipswich road runs through the west of the parish and marks the parish boundary. Part of Eye airfield is also within the parish boundary.

References

External links

Civil parishes in Suffolk
Mid Suffolk District